Clostridium novyi (oedematiens) a Gram-positive, endospore- forming, obligate anaerobic bacteria of the class Clostridia. It is ubiquitous, being found in the soil and faeces. It is pathogenic, causing a wide variety of diseases in man and animals.

Growth in culture proceeds through 3 stages: Initial growth wherein no toxin is produced; vigorous growth wherein toxin is produced; and spore formation wherein endospores are formed and toxin production decreases. It is suggested that type C may be type B that forms spores more readily so does not go through the toxin-production stage.

Isolating and identifying C novyi is difficult due to its extreme anaerobic nature. Commercial kits may not be adequate.

It is also fastidious and difficult to culture, requiring the presence of thiols.

Taxonomy
Clostridium novyi is considered to be made up from three clades, labelled A, B and C, distinguished by the range of toxins they produce. While strains of type C were not linked to disease to laboratory animals, presence and activity of toxins in C. novyi have been linked to infection with Bacteriophages.
Based on toxin production, Clostridium haemolyticum has been suggested to be considered a part of C. novyi, forming a separate type D in the genus. More recent 16S-rDNA studies however have suggested, that C. haemolyticus and types B and C of C. novyi may form a distinct genus, closely related to Clostridium botulinum type C and D, instead.

Toxins
The toxins are designated by Greek letters. The toxins normally produced by the various types are shown in table 1

The alpha-toxin of Clostridium botulinum types C and D, is similar to the C novyi beta-toxin.
The A and B toxins of Clostridium difficile show homology with the alpha-toxin of C novyi as does the lethal toxin of clostridium sordellii.

Alpha-toxin
The alpha-toxin is characterised as lethal and necrotizing.

The type A alpha-toxin is  oedematising. It acts by causing morphological changes to all cell types especially endothelial cells by inhibition of signal transduction pathways, resulting in the breakdown of cytoskeletal structures. The cells of the microvascular system become spherical and the attachments to neighbouring cells are reduced to thin strings. This results in leakage from the capillaries, leading to oedema. The threshold concentration for this action to occur is 5 ng/ml (5 parts per billion) with 50% of cells rounded at 50 ng/ml.

The duodenum is particularly sensitive to the toxin. Injection into dogs resulted in extreme oedema of the submucosal tissues of the duodenum while leaving the stomach uninjured. Injection into the eye resulted in lesions similar to flame haemorrhages found in diabetic retinopathy.

The toxin is a large 250-kDa protein the active part of which is the NH2-terminal 551 amino acid fragment. Alpha-toxins are glycosyltransferases, modifying and thereby inactivating different members of the Rho and Ras subfamily of small GTP-binding proteins. C novyi  type A alpha-toxin is unique in using UDP-N-acetylglucosamine rather than UDP-glucose as a substrate.

Beta-toxin
The beta-toxin is characterised as haemolytic, necrotizing lecithinase.

Gamma-toxin
The gamma-toxin is characterised as haemolytic, lecithinase.

Delta-toxin
The delta-toxin is characterised as oxygen labile haemolysin.

Epsilon-toxin
The epsilon-toxin is characterised as lecithino-vitelin and thought to be responsible for the pearly layer found in cultures.

Zeta-toxin
The zeta-toxin is characterised as haemolysin.

Human diseases
The type and severity of the disease caused depends on penetration of the tissues. The epithelium of the alimentary tract, in general, provides an effective barrier to penetration. However, spores may escape from the gut and lodge in any part of the body and result in spontaneous infection should local anaerobic conditions occur.

Tissue penetration
Wound infection by C novyi and many other clostridium species cause gas gangrene Spontaneous infection is mostly associated with predisposing factors of hematologic or colorectal malignancies and with diabetes mellitus, although Gram-negative organisms, including Escherichia coli, may lead to a gas gangrene-like syndrome in diabetic patients.  This presents with cellulitis and crepitus, and may be mistaken for gas gangrene.
Spontaneous, nontraumatic, or intrinsic infections from a bowel source have been increasingly reported recently.

Clostridium novyi has been implicated in mortality among injecting illegal drug users.

Epithelial infections
Symptoms are often non-specific including, colitis, oedematous duodenitis, and fever with somnolence.

Testing is problematical with figures presented by McLauchlin and Brazier [cited above] suggesting a false negative rate of about 40% under ideal conditions. Only positive results may be regarded as reliable. In the absence of a positive test, C. novyi type A may be inferred from characterisation by clinical observation, table 2.

Chronic infection leading to leaky capillaries may also cause retinal haemorrhages and oedema in the lower extremities leading to necrosis and gangrene. Leaky nephrons may compromise the ability of kidneys to concentrate urine leading to frequent urination and dehydration.

Animal diseases
Gas gangrene: infectious necrotic hepatitis (black disease)

See also 
 Clostridium novyi-NT, an attenuated form of Clostridium novyi-NT being studied for its potential use as a cancer treatment

References

Further reading

External links
 Type strain of Clostridium novyi at BacDive -  the Bacterial Diversity Metadatabase

Gram-positive bacteria
Gas gangrene
novyi
Bacteria described in 1894